The Congressional Equality Caucus, formerly the Congressional LGBTQ+ Caucus, was formed by openly gay representatives Tammy Baldwin and Barney Frank June 4, 2008, to advance LGBT+ rights. The caucus is co-chaired by the United States House of Representatives' ten openly LGBTQ members: Representatives Becca Balint, David Cicilline, Angie Craig, Sharice Davids, Robert Garcia, Chris Pappas, Mark Pocan, Eric Sorensen, Mark Takano, and Ritchie Torres.

With over 194 members the Congressional Equality Caucus became the largest caucus during the 118th United States Congress session.

Mission
The mission of the caucus is to work for LGBTQ rights, the repeal of laws discriminatory against LGBTQ persons, the elimination of hate-motivated violence, and improved health and well-being for all persons, regardless of sexual orientation, gender identity, or gender expression. The caucus serves as a resource for Members of Congress, their staffs, and the public on LGBTQ issues.  Unlike the Congressional Black Caucus, famous for admitting only black members, the LGBTQ+ Equality Caucus admits any member who is willing to advance LGBTQ rights, regardless of their sexual identity or orientation; it has historically been co-chaired by every openly-LGBTQ member of the House.

Equality PAC
In February 2016 the caucus formed the Equality PAC to support candidates running for federal office who are LGBTQ or seek to advance LGBTQ rights. On March 14, 2016, the board of the Equality PAC voted to endorse Hillary Clinton in the 2016 Presidential election.

Task Forces 
During the 114th United States Congress, the caucus formed the Transgender Equality Task Force (TETF) and the LGBTQ+ Aging Issues Task Force. The LGBTQ+ Aging Issues Task Force is currently chaired by Suzanne Bonamici and works to push for legislative and administrative action to protect the dignity and security of elderly LGBTQ people.

Membership

The below table summarizes the number of caucus members by party over a number of legislative sessions; the drop in membership numbers in the 114th congress was predominantly due to this being the first year that caucus members were charged fees for their membership ($400 per member, $2,100 per vice chair, $7,500 per co-chair):

List of Caucus members in the 117th Congress:

Co-chairs
 Becca Balint (D―Vermont)
 David Cicilline (D–Rhode Island)
 Angie Craig (D–Minnesota)
 Sharice Davids (D–Kansas)
 Robert Garcia (D―California)
 Chris Pappas (D–New Hampshire)
 Mark Pocan (D–Wisconsin)
 Eric Sorensen (D―Illinois)
 Mark Takano (D–California)
 Ritchie Torres (D–New York)

Vice chairs
Suzanne Bonamici (D–Oregon)
Judy Chu (D–California)
Lloyd Doggett (D–Texas)
Lizzie Fletcher (D–Texas)
Maxwell Frost (D—Florida)
Ruben Gallego (D–Arizona)
Sara Jacobs (D–California)
Pramila Jayapal (D–Washington)
Dan Kildee (D–Michigan)
Raja Krishnamoorthi (D–Illinois)
Barbara Lee (D–California)
Ted Lieu (D–California)
Grace Meng (D–New York)
Jerrold Nadler (D–New York)
Scott Peters (D–California)
Chellie Pingree (D–Maine)
Mike Quigley (D–Illinois)
Jamie Raskin (D–Maryland)
Linda Sánchez (D–California)
Mary Gay Scanlon (D–Pennsylvania)
Adam Schiff (D–California)
Darren Soto (D–Florida)
Debbie Wasserman Schultz (D–Florida)
Jennifer Wexton (D–Virginia)

Members
Pete Aguilar (D–California)
Colin Allred (D–Texas)
Jake Auchincloss (D–Massachusetts)
Nanette Barragán (D–California)
Joyce Beatty (D—Ohio)
Ami Bera (D–California)
Don Beyer (D–Virginia)
Lisa Blunt Rochester (D–Delaware)
Jamaal Bowman (D–New York)
Brendan Boyle (D–Pennsylvania)
Shontel Brown (D—Ohio)
Julia Brownley (D–California)
Nikki Budzinski (D—Illinois)
Cori Bush (D–Missouri)
Yadira Caraveo (D—Colorado)
Salud Carbajal (D–California)
Tony Cárdenas (D–California)
André Carson (D–Indiana)
Troy Carter (D—Louisiana)
Matt Cartwright (D–Pennsylvania)
Greg Casar (D–Texas)
Ed Case (D–Hawaii)
Sean Casten (D–Illinois)
Kathy Castor (D–Florida)
Joaquin Castro (D–Texas)
Sheila Cherfilus-McCormick (D–Florida)
Katherine Clark (D–Massachusetts)
Yvette Clarke (D–New York)
Emanuel Cleaver (D-Missouri)
Steve Cohen (D—Tennessee)
Gerry Connolly (D–Virginia)
Lou Correa (D–California)
Jim Costa (D–California)
Joe Courtney (D–Connecticut)
Jasmine Crockett (D—Texas)
Jason Crow (D–Colorado)
Danny K. Davis (D–Illinois) 
Madeleine Dean (D–Pennsylvania)
Diana DeGette (D–Colorado)
Rosa DeLauro (D-Connecticut)
Suzan DelBene (D–Washington)
Chris Deluzio (D—Pennsylvania)
Mark DeSaulnier (D–California)
Debbie Dingell (D–Michigan)
Veronica Escobar (D–Texas)
Anna Eshoo (D–California)
Adriano Espaillat (D–New York)
Dwight Evans (D–Pennsylvania)
Bill Foster (D–Illinois)
Valerie Foushee (D—North Carolina)
Lois Frankel (D–Florida)
John Garamendi (D—California)
Chuy García (D—Illinois)
Sylvia Garcia (D–Texas)
Marie Gluesenkamp Perez (D—Washington)
Jared Golden (D–Maine)
Dan Goldman (D—New York)
Jimmy Gomez (D–California)
Vincente Gonzalez (D—Texas)
Josh Gottheimer (D–New Jersey)
Al Green (D–Texas)
Raúl Grijalva (D–Arizona)
Jahana Hayes (D–Connecticut)
Brian Higgins (D–New York)
Jim Himes (D–Connecticut)
Steven Horsford (D–Nevada)
Chrissy Houlahan (D–Pennsylvania)
Val Hoyle (D–Oregon)
Jared Huffman (D–California)
Glenn Ivey (D-Maryland)
Jeff Jackson (D-North Carolina)
Sheila Jackson Lee (D—Texas)
Hank Johnson (D–Georgia) 
Sydney Kamlager-Dove (D–California)
Bill Keating (D–Massachusetts)
Robin Kelly (D–Illinois)
Ro Khanna (D–California)
Derek Kilmer (D–Washington)
Andy Kim (D–New Jersey)
Ann McLane Kuster (D–New Hampshire)
Greg Landsman (D—Ohio)
Rick Larsen (D—Washington)
John B. Larson (D–Connecticut)
Summer Lee (D—Pennsylvania)
Susie Lee (D–Nevada)
Teresa Leger Fernandez (D–New Mexico)
Mike Levin (D–California)
Zoe Lofgren (D–California)
Stephen F. Lynch (D–Massachusetts)
Seth Magaziner (D–Rhode Island)
Kathy Manning (D–North Carolina)
Doris Matsui (D–California)
Lucy McBath (D–Georgia)
Morgan McGarvey (D–Kentucky)
James McGovern (D–Massachusetts)
Gregory Meeks (D—New York)
Rob Menendez (D–New Jersey)
Gwen Moore (D–Wisconsin)
Joseph Morelle (D–New York)
Jared Moskowitz (D—Florida)
Seth Moulton (D–Massachusetts)
Frank J. Mrvan (D–Indiana)
Kevin Mullin (D—California)
Grace Napolitano (D–California)
Joe Neguse (D–Colorado)
Wiley Nickel (D–North Carolina)
Donald Norcross (D–New Jersey)
Eleanor Holmes Norton (D—District of Colombia)
Alexandria Ocasio-Cortez (D–New York)
Ilhan Omar (D–Minnesota)
Frank Pallone (D–New Jersey)
Jimmy Panetta (D–California)
Bill Pascrell (D—New Jersey)
Nancy Pelosi (D–California)
Mary Peltola (D—Alaska)
Brittany Pettersen (D–Colorado)
Dean Phillips (D–Minnesota)
Katie Porter (D–California)
Ayanna Pressley (D–Massachusetts)
Delia Ramirez (D—Illinois)
Deborah K. Ross (D–North Carolina)
Raul Ruiz (D–California)
Dutch Ruppersberger (D—Maryland)
Pat Ryan (D—New York)
Andrea Salinas (D—Oregon) 
John Sarbanes (D–Maryland)
Jan Schakowsky (D–Illinois)
Brad Schneider (D–Illinois)
Hillary Scholten (D—Michigan)
Kim Schrier (D–Washington)
Bobby Scott (D–Virginia)
David Scott (D–Georgia)
Terri Sewell (D—Alabama)
Brad Sherman (D–California)
Mikie Sherrill (D–New Jersey)
Elissa Slotkin (D–Michigan)
Adam Smith (D–Washington)
Abigail Spanberger (D–Virginia)
Melanie Stansbury (D–New Mexico)
Greg Stanton (D–Arizona)
Haley Stevens (D–Michigan)
Marilyn Strickland (D–Washington)
Eric Swalwell (D–California)
Emilia Sykes (D–Ohio)
Shri Thanedar (D—Michigan)
Dina Titus (D–Nevada)
Rashida Tlaib (D–Michigan)
Jill Tokuda (D–Hawaii)
Paul Tonko (D–New York)
Norma Torres (D–California)
Lori Trahan (D–Massachusetts)
David Trone (D–Maryland)
Lauren Underwood (D–Illinois)
Juan Vargas (D–California)
Marc Veasey (D–Texas)
Nydia Velázquez (D–New York)
Bonnie Watson Coleman (D–New Jersey)
Susan Wild (D–Pennsylvania)
Nikema Williams (D–Georgia)
Frederica Wilson (D–Florida)

Former co-chairs

Tammy Baldwin (D–Wisconsin; elected to Senate in 2012)
Barney Frank (D–Massachusetts; retired in 2013)
Mondaire Jones (D–New York; lost renomination in 2022 due to redistricting)
Sean Patrick Maloney (D–New York; lost re-election in 2022)
Jared Polis (D–Colorado; elected to become Governor of Colorado in 2018)
Kyrsten Sinema (D–Arizona; elected to Senate in 2018)
Katie Hill (D–California; resigned in 2019)

Former members

Neil Abercrombie (D–Hawaii; resigned to successfully run for Governor of Hawaii in 2010)
Rob Andrews (D–New Jersey; resigned in 2014)
Gary Ackerman (D–New York; retired in 2013)
Karen Bass (D–California; retired to run successfully for Mayor of Los Angeles in 2022) 
Xavier Becerra (D–California; retired to successfully run for California Attorney General in 2017)
Shelley Berkley (D–Nevada; unsuccessfully ran for Senate in 2012)
Howard Berman (D–California; defeated in 2012)
Earl Blumenauer (D–Oregon; left caucus in 2023)
Bob Brady (D–Pennsylvania)
Bruce Braley (D–Iowa; unsuccessfully ran for Senate in 2014)
Anthony Brindisi (D–New York; defeated in 2021 after contested election)
Anthony Brown (D–Maryland; retired to run successfully to become Attorney General of Maryland in 2022.
Tim Bishop (D–New York; retired in 2015)
Cheri Bustos (D–Illinois; retired in 2022)
Lois Capps (D–California; retired in 2017)
Michael Capuano (D–Massachusetts)
Gil Cisneros (D–California; defeated in 2020)
Hansen Clarke (D–Michigan; defeated in 2012)
Gerry Connolly (D–Virginia)
John Conyers (D–Michigan)
TJ Cox (D–California; defeated in 2020)
Charlie Crist (D–Florida; retired to run unsuccessfully for Governor of Florida in 2022)
Joe Cunningham (D–South Carolina; defeated in 2020)
Carlos Curbelo (R–Florida; defeated in 2018)
Susan Davis (D–California; retired in 2021)
Peter DeFazio (D–Oregon)
Bill Delahunt (D–Massachusetts; retired in 2011)
John Delaney (D–Maryland)
Rosa DeLauro (D–Connecticut)
Antonio Delgado (D–New York, resigned in 2022 to successfully become Lieutenant Governor of New York)
Val Demings (D–Florida; retired)
Ted Deutch (D–Florida, resigned in 2022 to head the American Jewish Committee.) 
Mike Doyle (D–Pennsylvania)
Keith Ellison (D–Minnesota)
Eliot Engel (D–New York; defeated in primary in 2020)
Elizabeth Esty (D–Connecticut)
Chaka Fattah (D–Pennsylvania)
Bob Filner (D–California; resigned to successfully run for Mayor of San Diego in 2012)
Abby Finkenauer (D–Iowa; defeated in 2020)
Marcia L. Fudge (D–Ohio)
Chuy García (D–Illinois)
Tulsi Gabbard (D–Hawaii; unsuccessfully ran for Democratic Party Presidential Nominee in 2020, did not run for reelection) 
Gabby Giffords (D–Arizona; resigned in 2012)
Charlie Gonzalez (D–Texas; retired in 2013)
Luis Gutierrez (D–Illinois)
Deb Haaland (D–New Mexico; resigned to become United States Secretary of the Interior in 2021)
Kai Kahele (D–Hawaii; retired to run unsuccessfully for Governor of Hawaii in 2022)
Janice Hahn (D–California; elected to Los Angeles County Board of Supervisors in 2016)
Colleen Hanabusa (D–Hawaii; unsuccessfully ran for Governor of Hawaii in 2018)
Richard L. Hanna (R–New York; retired in 2017)
Phil Hare (D–Illinois; defeated in 2010)
Jane Harman (D–California; resigned in 2011)
Alcee Hastings (D–Florida; died in 2021)
Nan Hayworth (R–New York; defeated in 2012)
Denny Heck (D–Washington; successfully ran for Lt. Governor of Washington in 2020)
Martin Heinrich (D–New Mexico; elected to Senate in 2012)
Maurice Hinchey (D–New York; retired in 2013)
Mazie Hirono (D–Hawaii; elected to Senate in 2012)
Eleanor Holmes Norton (D–District of Columbia)
Rush Holt Jr. (D–New Jersey; retired in 2015)
Steve Israel (D–New York; retired in 2017)
Hakeem Jeffries (D–New York; left caucus when elected Minority Leader)
Eddie Bernice Johnson (D–Texas; retired in 2022) 
Joe Kennedy III (D–Massachusetts; unsuccessfully ran for Democratic nominee for U.S. Senate in 2020, did not run for reelection)
Patrick J. Kennedy (D–Rhode Island; retired in 2011)
Ruben Kihuen (D–Nevada)
Mary Jo Kilroy (D–Ohio; defeated in 2010)
Dennis Kucinich (D–Ohio; defeated in 2012)
Conor Lamb (D–Pennsylvania; retired to run unsuccessfully for Democratic nomination for U.S. Senate of Pennsylvania in 2022)
James Langevin (D–Rhode Island)
Andy Levin (D–Michigan; lost nomination in 2022)  
Sander Levin (D–Michigan)
John Lewis (D–Georgia)
Dave Loebsack (D–Iowa; retired in 2021)
Alan Lowenthal (D–California; retired in 2022)
Nita Lowey (D–New York; retired in 2021)
Elaine Luria (D-Vermont; lost reelection in 2022)
Michelle Lujan Grisham (D–New Mexico; elected to become Governor of New Mexico in 2018)
Stephen Lynch (D–Massachusetts)
Dan Maffei (D–New York; defeated in 2014)
Tom Malinowski (D-New Jersey; lost reelection in 2022)
Carolyn Maloney (D–New York; lost renomination in 2022)
Ben McAdams (D–Utah; defeated in 2020)
Carolyn McCarthy (D–New York)
Betty McCollum (D–Minnesota)
Jim McDermott (D–Washington; retired in 2017)
Jim McGovern (D–Massachusetts)
Don McEachin (D-Virginia; died in 2022) 
Michael McMahon (D–New York; defeated in 2010)
Jerry McNerney (D–California)
Michael R. McNulty (D–New York; retired in 2008)
George Miller (D–California; retired in 2015)
Jim Moran (D–Virginia; retired in 2015)
Debbie Mucarsel-Powell (D–Florida; defeated in 2020)
Chris Murphy (D–Connecticut; elected to Senate in 2012) 
Patrick Murphy (D–Pennsylvania; defeated in 2010)
Patrick Murphy (D–Florida; unsuccessfully ran for Senate in 2016)
Stephanie Murphy (D–Florida; retired in 2022)
Grace Napolitano (D–California)
Marie Newman (D–Illinois; lost renomination in 2022)
Beto O'Rourke (D–Texas)
Ed Perlmutter (D–Colorado; retired in 2022) 
Gary Peters (D–Michigan; elected to Senate in 2014)
Kathleen Rice (D–New York; retired)
Laura Richardson (D–California; defeated in 2012)
Ileana Ros-Lehtinen (R–Florida; retired in 2019)
Max Rose (D–New York; defeated in 2020)
Steven Rothman (D–New Jersey; defeated in 2012)
Harley Rouda (D–California; defeated in 2020)
Gregorio Sablan (D–Northern Mariana Islands)
Loretta Sanchez (D–California)
John Sarbanes (D–Maryland)
Kurt Schrader (D–Oregon)
Allyson Schwartz (D–Pennsylvania; unsuccessfully ran for Governor of Pennsylvania in 2014)
José E. Serrano (D–New York; retired in 2021)
Joe Sestak (D–Pennsylvania; unsuccessfully ran for Senate in 2010)
Donna Shalala (D–Florida; defeated in 2020)
Chris Shays (R–Connecticut; defeated in 2008)
Carol Shea-Porter (D–New Hampshire)
Hilda Solis (D–California; resigned to become United States Secretary of Labor in 2009)
Pete Stark (D–California; defeated in 2012)
Betty Sutton (D–Ohio; defeated in 2012)
Xochitl Torres Small (D–New Mexico; defeated in 2020)
Edolphus Towns (D–New York; retired in 2013)
Jeff Van Drew (R–New Jersey; left caucus in 2020, rejoined in 2021, and left again in 2022)
Chris Van Hollen (D–Maryland; elected to Senate in 2016)
Tim Walz (D–Minnesota; elected to become Governor of Minnesota in 2018)
Peter Welch (D-Vermont; retired to successfully run for United States Senator of Vermont)
Robert Wexler (D–Florida; resigned to become president of the Center for Middle East Peace and Economic Cooperation in 2010)
Lynn Woolsey (D–California; retired in 2013)
David Wu (D–Oregon; resigned in 2011)

See also

Congressional caucus
Caucuses of the United States Congress
List of LGBT members of the United States Congress
 California Legislative LGBT Caucus
 Pennsylvania LGBT Equality Caucus
New York City Council LGBT Caucus

References

External links

LGBTQ+ Equality Caucus — official website
LGBT Equality Caucus — web archived 115th Congress
"Congressional caucus launched for LGBT rights", The Advocate (Gay.com), June 4, 2008.
DiGuglielmo, Joey. "Frank, Baldwin launch LGBT Equality Caucus", The Washington Blade, June 4, 2008.
"Keith Ellison is Proud to be Named Vice-Chairman of Bipartisan Congressional LGBT Equality Caucus," Re-Elect Keith Ellison for U.S. Congress, retrieved July 20, 2008.

2008 establishments in the United States
Caucuses of the United States Congress
LGBT organizations in the United States
LGBT caucuses
Organizations established in 2008
United States political action committees
527 organizations